Althaesia is a genus of beetles in the family Biphyllidae, containing the following species:

 Althaesia acuminata Arrow, 1929
 Althaesia arrowi Grouvelle, 1914
 Althaesia leai Blackburn
 Althaesia pilosa Pascoe
 Althaesia sericeus Lea

References

Biphyllidae
Cleroidea genera